Zébala is a small town and rural commune in the Cercle of Koutiala in the Sikasso Region of southern Mali. The commune covers an area of 312 square kilometers and includes 8 settlements. In the 2009 census it had a population of 17,278. The town of Zébala, the administrative centre (chef-lieu) of the commune, is 35 km east-southeast of Koutiala.

References

External links
.

Communes of Sikasso Region